Bungo (stylized as BUNGO) is a Japanese baseball-themed manga series written and illustrated by Yūji Ninomiya. It has been serialized in Shueisha's seinen manga magazine  Weekly Young Jump since December 2014, with its chapters collected in 33 tankōbon volumes as of November 2022.

Publication
Bungo is written and illustrated by Yūji Ninomiya. The series began in Shueisha's Weekly Young Jump on December 18, 2014. Shueisha has collected its chapters into individual tankōbon volumes. The first volume was released on July 17, 2015. As of November 17, 2022, thirty-three volumes have been released.

Volume list

Reception
As of June 2021, the manga had over 3.5 million copies in circulation.

References

Further reading

External links
 

Baseball in anime and manga
Seinen manga
Shueisha manga